K. Nalla Thambi is an Indian politician and was a member of the 14th Tamil Nadu Legislative Assembly from the Egmore Constituency in Chennai District, which is reserved for candidates from the Scheduled Castes. He represented the Desiya Murpokku Dravida Kazhagam party.

The elections of 2016 resulted in his constituency being won by K. S. Ravichandran.

References 

Desiya Murpokku Dravida Kazhagam politicians
Tamil Nadu MLAs 2011–2016
Living people
Politicians from Chennai
Year of birth missing (living people)